A diminutive is a word obtained by modifying a root word to convey a slighter degree of its root meaning, either to convey the smallness of the object or quality named, or to convey a sense of intimacy or endearment. A  (abbreviated ) is a word-formation device used to express such meanings. In many languages, diminutives are word forms that are formed from the root word by affixation. In most languages, diminutives can also be formed as multi-word constructions such as "Tiny Tim", or "Little Dorrit". Diminutives are often employed as nicknames and pet names when speaking to small children and when expressing extreme tenderness and intimacy to an adult. The opposite of the diminutive form is the augmentative.

In most languages that form diminutives by affixation, this is a productive part of the language. For example, in Spanish  can be a nickname for someone who is overweight, and by adding an  suffix, it becomes  which is more affectionate.  A  (example in Polish:  →  → ; example in Italian:  →  → ) is a diminutive form with two diminutive suffixes rather than one. While many languages apply a grammatical diminutive to nouns, a few – including Slovak, Dutch, Spanish, Latin, Polish, Bulgarian, Czech, Russian and Estonian – also use it for adjectives (in Polish:  →  → ) and even other parts of speech (Ukrainian  →  →  — to sleep or Slovak  →  →  — to sleep,  →  — to run). In English, the alteration of meaning is often conveyed through clipping, making the words shorter and more colloquial. Diminutives formed by adding affixes in other languages are often longer and (as colloquial) not necessarily understood.

Diminutives in isolating languages may grammaticalize strategies other than suffixes or prefixes. In Mandarin Chinese, for example, other than the nominal prefix 小 xiǎo and nominal suffixes 儿/兒 -r and 子 -zi, reduplication is a productive strategy, e.g.,  →  and  → . In formal Mandarin usage, the use of diminutives is relatively infrequent, as they tend to be considered to be rather colloquial than formal. Some Wu Chinese dialects use a tonal affix for nominal diminutives; that is, diminutives are formed by changing the tone of the word.

In some contexts, diminutives are also employed in a pejorative sense to denote that someone or something is weak or childish. For example, one of the last Western Roman emperors was Romulus Augustus, but his name was diminuted to "Romulus Augustulus" to express his powerlessness.

Examples 
 Charlie from Charles
 Chuck from Charles
 darling from dear
 duckling from duck
 cygnet from Old French cigne; French cygne (both: swan)
 ringlet from ring
 doggie from dog

See also
Affect (linguistics)
Augmentative
Comparison (grammar)
Diminutives in Australian English
Hypocorism (diminutives of given names)
List of diminutives by language
-ie ending

References

Linguistic morphology